Mauro Pelaschier (born 29 April 1949) is an Italian sailor. He competed at the 1972 Summer Olympics and the 1976 Summer Olympics.

References

External links
 

1949 births
Living people
Italian male sailors (sport)
Olympic sailors of Italy
Sailors at the 1972 Summer Olympics – Finn
Sailors at the 1976 Summer Olympics – Finn
People from Monfalcone
Mediterranean Games gold medalists for Italy
Sportspeople from Friuli-Venezia Giulia